Kincheloe is an American surname derived from Kinsella, an Irish name. Notable people with the surname include:
 David Hayes Kincheloe (1877–1950), U.S. Representative from Kentucky
 Iven Carl Kincheloe, Jr. (1928–1958), American test pilot, recipient of the Silver Star and Distinguished Flying Cross, and a double ace in the Korean War
 Joe L. Kincheloe (1950–2008), American scholar of education and pedagogy

Fictional characters
 Sgt. James (aka Ivan) "Kinch" Kinchloe, a character on Hogan's Heroes

See also
Kinchlow, surname

References

Americanized surnames